William E. Watson was born in New York City.  He is Professor of History at Immaculata University in Malvern, Pennsylvania.  He received his PhD in Medieval History from the University of Pennsylvania.  He is the director of the Duffy's Cut Project.  He was a Commonwealth Speaker for the Pennsylvania Humanities Council  2006–2007, and was also the recipient of the Lindback Distinguished Teaching Award at Immaculata University for the year 2006–2007. Director of the National Endowment for the Humanities Summer Teachers' Institute at Immaculata University, "Duffy's Cut: Investigating Immigration, Industrialization and Illness in 19th-Century America" (July, 2016)

Books
 Massacre at Duffy's Cut: Tragedy and Conspiracy on the Pennsylvania Railroad, William E. Watson and J. Francis Watson (The History Press, 2018) 
  
  Tricolor and Crescent: France and the Islamic World (Praeger, 2003)
  The Collapse of Communism in the Soviet Union (Greenwood, 1998)
  Irish Americans: The History and Culture of a People, William E. Watson and Eugene J. Halus, Eds. (ABC-Clio, 2015)

Scholarly articles
 "The Irish and Ireland," The Encyclopedia of Greater Philadelphia (2017) 
 "Duffy's Cut," The Encyclopedia of Greater Philadelphia (2015)  
 “History and Memory at Duffy’s Cut,” Railroad History (Fall/Winter, 2014), no. 211, 76-87  
 Watson's paper at the Immaculata University Chronicle of Faith Conference (April 4, 2008) is available

Some of his publications in medieval history are available
at De Re Militari, the medieval military history society:
 
  

Watson's paper at the University of Oregon conference The Millennium: Russia and Christianity AD 988-1988 (April 11, 1988)

Dissertation
Watson's dissertation at the University of Pennsylvania:

References

21st-century American historians
21st-century American male writers
Living people
University of Pennsylvania alumni
Immaculata University faculty
Educators from New York City
Historians from New York (state)
Year of birth missing (living people)
American male non-fiction writers